Peter and the Magic Egg is a 1983 animated musical Easter television special produced by Murakami-Wolf-Swenson. It is narrated by Uncle Amos the egg, voiced by Ray Bolger. The special aired in syndication on March 23, 1983.

This special was produced as a promotional tie-in for Paas Easter egg dye.

Plot
The Doppler family, Pennsylvania Dutch farmers, are in debt to Tobias Tinwhiskers. Tobias Toot, a local farmer that successfully mechanized his farm leading to him taking over neighboring farms, the local bank and the town itself,  previously had been converted into Tobias Tinwhiskers as he so loved machines, he underwent a procedure to become mechanical altogether himself. Mother Nature sends a baby, Peter Paas, to help the Dopplers out of their desperate situation.

Peter Paas grows up and works on the farm and, in order to pay the mortgage on the farm to Tinwhiskers, he arranges a contract with the Easter Bunny to supply colored eggs for Easter. He is helped by the cast of anthropomorphic farm animals to produce and dye the eggs and make the annual mortgage payment on Easter day. Tinwhiskers, enraged that he cannot repossess the farm, challenges Peter to a ploughing contest and arranges for Peter to fall down a well. Peter remains in a coma and sadness hangs over the farm. The animals went to Mother Nature for help as she gave them an egg to hatch which will awake Peter. The egg hatches into a Kookibird bringing laughter back to the farms. This wakes Peter and returns Tinwhiskers to human form. Tobias Toot gives back the town, renamed Paasville, and goes to work for the Dopplers while Peter leaves the farm to return to Mother Nature to help other families in need.

Cast

Ray Bolger as Uncle Amos Egg
Al Eisenmann as Peter Paas
Joan Gerber as Mama Doppler / Feathers / Queen Bessie / Mother Nature
Bob Holt as Papa Doppler / Kookybird
Robert Ridgely as Tobias Tinwhiskers / Cotton
Russi Taylor as Lollichop
Charles Woolf as Terrence / King Bossy

Trivia

                                          
This was the last special produced by Muller/Rosen.

References

External links

1983 television specials
1983 animated films
1983 films
1980s American animated films
1980s American television specials
1980s animated short films
Amish in popular culture
Easter television specials
American animated short films
Animated television specials
Musical television specials
First-run syndicated television programs in the United States
Television shows written by Romeo Muller
Easter Bunny in television
1980s English-language films